Marilyn Ann Meyers (born 1942) is a former American diplomat. She served as Chargé d'Affaires ad interim to Burma from September 1994 to October 1996.

Meyers grew up in Memphis, Tennessee. She completed her undergraduate degree at Southwestern at Memphis (now called Rhodes College) in 1964 with a BA with honors in international studies.  With a Woodrow Wilson Fellowship, she went on to the Paul H. Nitze School of Advanced International Studies earning a master's degree in International Studies?

References

External links
 https://web.archive.org/web/20080314214120/http://www.state.gov/r/pa/ho/po/com/10404.htm
Marilyn Ann Meyers (1942–)

1942 births
Living people
Ambassadors of the United States to Myanmar
People from Memphis, Tennessee
American women ambassadors
Rhodes College alumni
Paul H. Nitze School of Advanced International Studies alumni
21st-century American women